Mayonnaise are a five-piece Filipino alternative rock band, fronted by Monty Macalino and famous for winning the "Red Horse Muziklaban" contest in 2004.

History
The band were named after the song "Mayonaise" by The Smashing Pumpkins and were formed in 2002 with a number of earlier former members. They were launched into the mainstream in 2004 after winning the Grand Prize at the Red Horse Muziklaban 2004 as a four-piece lineup. Composed of chief songwriter Monty Macalino, Paga Manikan, Lee Maningas and Shan Regalado, their debut self-titled album, Mayonnaise, was launched along with their 1st single, "Jopay", through Sony Music Philippines. The character Jopay in the single refers to a former member of the Sexbomb Dancers. Their next single, "Bakit Part 2", became a radio airplay hit. In 2008, bassist Lee Maningas left the band to emigrate to the United States and was replaced by Poch Villalon. 

Their follow-up 2nd album, Pa'no Nangyari Yun?, was released on 2006, with their carrier single "Salamin".  The same year, the band also covered the song "Ipagpatawad Mo", originally recorded by VST and Company. The song was included in their collaboration album, Hopia Mani Popcorn.

On March 21, 2008, Mayonnaise released their 3rd album, Tersera, which was launched with the singles "Singungaling", "Torres" and "Sakto". The band released their 4th album, Pula, in 2010 with the carrier single "Sa Pula, Sa Puti".

On May 10, 2011, the group also sang "Sabay Tayo", the TV theme song of ABS-CBN 2's reality show The Biggest Loser: Pinoy Edition.

In 2013, Paga Manikan left the group to concentrate on his own band, the Banat Boys. Popularly known as a 4-piece group, Mayonnaise announced its 3 new members shortly after Manikan's departure through their official social media accounts: Aaron Brosoto, Carlo Servano and Jaztin Mercado, who all used to play with them as session musicians on guitars and keyboards.

In 2014, keyboardist Jaztin Mercado left the band to move to Singapore. In the same year, the band recruited Maan Furio to play guitars, as well as do backing vocals. In late 2014, bassist and backing vocalist Poch Villalon also left the band to pursue other interests. Villalon has since been a session player for Rico Blanco and synth player of Silent Sanctuary after departing and was replaced by Nikki Tirona to fill in his position as bassist and backing vocalist for the band. In mid-2015, lead guitarist Aaron Brosoto left the band to pursue other interests as well.

In November 2017, guitarist and backing vocalist Maan Furio amicably left the band to pursue a professional career in Dubai, UAE. Keano Swing later filled in her spot as replacement. However, later in 2020, Furio returned to the band as a session guitarist and backing vocalist.

In November 2019, a remastered version of the band's eponymous debut album was released in commemoration of their 15th anniversary.

The song Jopay experienced a resurgence in popularity after becoming viral in Tiktok in late 2022 and early 2023, attributed to its use as part of the soundtrack of the 2022 film Ngayon Kaya. 
The song entered the top 25 in Billboard's Philippines Songs chart, spending a total of 12 weeks and peaking at number 5. Mayonaise acknowledged their 2005 song's popularity by performing it live together with Kosang Marlon, a social media personality who popularized a modified rendition of the song on Tiktok.

Band members

Current members 
Monty Macalino – lead vocals, guitars, keyboard synthesizer (2002–present)
Shan Regalado – drums, percussion (2002–present)
Carlo Servano – guitars (2013–present); backing vocals (2017–present)
Nikki Tirona – bass guitar, backing vocals (2014–present)
Keano Swing – guitars, backing vocals (2017–present)

Touring members 
Jio Clavano – guitars, backing vocals (2017–present)

Former members 
Lee Maningas – bass guitar, backing vocals (2002–2008, occasional guesting 2022–present)
Paga Manikan – guitars (2002–2013, occasional guesting 2021–present)
Poch Villalon – bass guitar, backing vocals (2008–2014)
Jaztin Mercado – keyboards, keytar (2013–2014)
Aaron Brosoto – guitars, backing vocals (2013–2015)
Maan Furio – acoustic guitar, guitars, backing vocals (2014–2017, touring 2020–present)

Timeline

Discography

Studio albums

Compilation albums 
Red Horse Muziklaban 2004 Compilation (Sony Music, 2004)
Pinoy Blonde OST (Star Music, 2005)
The Best Of Manila Sound: Hopia Mani Popcorn (Viva Records, 2007)
Live! The Album: Music of the Level Up! Nation (Star Music, 2008)
The Reunion: An Eraserheads Tribute Album (Star Music, 2012)

Live albums 
Live At The Social House (2018)

Extended Plays (EP) 
B-sides & Rarities (2012)
Mayonnaise 2014    (2014)
Pa'no Nangyari Yun (2016)

Singles and music videos 
Jopay
Bakit Part 2
Ipagpatawad Mo (originally by VST & Co., also covered by Janno Gibbs)
Ligaya (originally by The Eraserheads, also covered by Kitchie Nadal)
Sinungaling
Tersera
Torres
Sa Pula, Sa Puti
Kapag Lasing Malambing
Sabay Tayo (theme from ABS-CBN 2's The Biggest Loser: Pinoy Edition)
Dahil Ikaw (Ang Kailangan Ko)
Synesthesia
Sana Kung (2012 re-release)
Paraan
Parang
Dear Classmate
Porta
Ayaw Mo Na Sa Akin
Pag Wala Ka
Tayo Na Lang Dalawa
You Can't Be Right
Five Ever
Kumander

Awards and nominations

References

External links 
Mayonnaise official Facebook account

Filipino rock music groups
Musical groups established in 2002
Musical groups from Metro Manila
Sony Music Philippines artists